Fear Factor: Khatron Ke Khiladi Darr Ka Blockbuster is the fifth season of Indian stunt/action reality game show Fear Factor: Khatron Ke Khiladi , based on the American Fear Factor. The series premiered on Colors TV. It was the 1st season of the series to include both male and female participants.  Rohit Shetty joined the show for the first time as host and has subsequently hosted all the following season. the first episode was narrated by Bollywood actor Amitabh Bachchan.Rajneesh Duggal was the winner of this season and Gurmeet Chaudhary became the runner-up.

Contestants

Elimination chart

  Winner
  1st runner-up
  2nd runner-up
  Finalists
  Jacket
 Won First Task
 Was Exempted from performing Pre-Elimination stunt and Elimination stunt
 Lost First Task
 Won Pre-Elimination stunt
 Saved from elimination by winning elimination stunt 
 Bottom Position
  Not in Competition
 Wild Card Entry 
 Eliminated
 Quit

References

External links
 

05
2014 Indian television seasons
Colors TV original programming